Hydrelia condensata is a moth in the family Geometridae. It is found in North America, including Indiana, Maryland, Massachusetts, Minnesota, New Brunswick, New Hampshire, Ohio, Pennsylvania, Quebec, Tennessee and West Virginia.

The wingspan is about 18 mm.

References

Moths described in 1862
Asthenini
Moths of North America